George Guy Dodson FRS FMedSci (13 January 1937 – 24 December 2012), was a British biochemist who specialised in protein crystallography at the University of York.

Education
Dodson graduated from the University of New Zealand where he was awarded a Bachelor of Science and Doctor of Philosophy degrees. His doctoral thesis, completed in 1961, was titled An X-ray analysis of an alkaloid and some investigation into nickel bis-salicylaldahyde triethylene tetramine.

Career
Dodson did postdoctoral research with Dorothy Hodgkin at the University of Oxford. He devised along with Hodgkin, very intricate experimental, crystallographic and computer techniques that led to the final solution of the structure of insulin. 
Dodson was head of the structural biology laboratories at the University of York and National Institute for Medical Research, London. During his career he collaborated with many scientists including Dale Wigley, Gideon Davies, Andrzej Brzozowski, Leo Brady and Max Perutz.

Awards and honours
Dodson was elected a Fellow of the Royal Society (FRS) in 1994. His nomination reads 

Dodson was also a Foreign Member of the Indian National Science Academy (ForMemINSA) and the Academy of Medical Sciences (FMedSci).

He was a recipient of the RSC Structural Chemistry Award in 1991.

Personal life
Dodson was married to the scientist Eleanor Dodson with whom he had four children.

References

1937 births
2012 deaths
British crystallographers
Academics of the University of York
Fellows of the Academy of Medical Sciences (United Kingdom)
New Zealand Fellows of the Royal Society
Foreign Fellows of the Indian National Science Academy
National Institute for Medical Research faculty
People from Palmerston North